The 198th (2/1st East Lancashire) Brigade was an infantry brigade of  the British Army that saw service during the First World War with the 66th (2nd East Lancashire) Division. Reformed in the Second World War as 198th Infantry Brigade it served with 54th (East Anglian) Infantry Division and remained in the United Kingdom throughout the war, before disbanding in late 1943.

First World War
The brigade was raised as a duplicate of the East Lancashire Brigade. It was part of the 66th (2nd East Lancashire) Division, from those men in the Territorial Force who originally had not agreed to serve overseas. However, the brigade ended up serving in the trenches of the Western Front, suffering horrendous casualties in March 1918 during Operation Michael, the opening phase of the German Army's Spring Offensive. As with the rest of the division, the brigade suffered extremely heavy casualties and had to be completely reformed. The brigade saw service during the Hundred Days Offensive and the war ended on 11 November 1918.

Order of battle
 2/4th Battalion, East Lancashire Regiment (renamed 4th Battalion 19 February 1918)
 2/5th Battalion, East Lancashire Regiment (left July 1918)
 2/9th Battalion, Manchester Regiment (left 22 July 1918)
 2/10th Battalion, Manchester Regiment (disbanded 15 February 1918)
 203rd Machine Gun Company, Machine Gun Corps (moved to 66th Battalion, Machine Gun Corps 11 March 1918)
 198th Trench Mortar Battery
 5th (Service) Battalion, Royal Inniskilling Fusiliers (from 19 July 1918)
 6th (Service) Battalion, Royal Dublin Fusiliers (from 19 August 1918)
 6th Battalion, Lancashire Fusiliers (from 22 September 1918)

Second World War
Both the brigade and division were disbanded in 1919, shortly after the end of the Great War. However, the brigade was reformed, now as the 198th Infantry Brigade, in the Territorial Army shortly before the outbreak of the Second World War in 1939, as part of the expansion of the Territorial Army when war with Nazi Germany seemed inevitable. It was again assigned to the 66th (East Lancashire) Division. However, the 66th Division was disbanded in June 1940 shortly after the British Expeditionary Force (BEF) was evacuated from Dunkirk. After the disbandment of the 66th Division, the brigade was independent for six months before joining the 54th (East Anglian) Infantry Division until it was disbanded near the end of 1943. The 8th King's Regiment (Liverpool) and the 6th Border Regiment were retrained as Beach groups for the upcoming invasion of France and the 7th Borders were transferred to the 222nd Brigade (later 213th Brigade) and the 198th Infantry Brigade ceased to exist and was not reformed in the Territorial Army after the war.

Order of battle
 8th (Irish) Battalion, King's Regiment (Liverpool) (until 4 July 1943)
 6th Battalion, Border Regiment (until 9 September 1943)
 7th Battalion, Border Regiment (until 9 December 1942)
 198th Infantry Brigade Anti-Tank Company (formed 30 July 1940, disbanded 14 July 1941)
 2nd Battalion, Hertfordshire Regiment (from 9 December 1942 until 23 August 1943)

Commanders
 Brigadier J.M. Radcliffe (until 12 August 1941)
 Brigadier A.C.T. Evanson (from 12 August 1941 until 10 May 1943)
 Brigadier R.K. Arbuthnott (from 10 May 1943 until 7 October 1943)
 Brigadier B.U.S. Cripps (from 7 October 1943)

References

Infantry brigades of the British Army in World War I
Infantry brigades of the British Army in World War II
B198
Military units and formations established in 1914
Military units and formations disestablished in 1919
Military units and formations established in 1939
Military units and formations disestablished in 1943